An Song-il (also known as An Song-il I; born 30 November 1992) is a North Korean footballer who plays as a defender for April 25 and the North Korea national team.

Career
An was included in North Korea's squad for the 2019 AFC Asian Cup in the United Arab Emirates.

Career statistics

International

References

External links
 
 
 
 An Song-il at WorldFootball.com
 An Song-il at DPRKFootball

1992 births
Living people
People from Chongjin
North Korean footballers
North Korea international footballers
Association football defenders
April 25 Sports Club players
2019 AFC Asian Cup players